Fred Barney Taylor (born August 25, 1948) is an American independent filmmaker. He is best known for directing The Polymath or, The Life and Opinions of Samuel R. Delany, Gentleman in 2007 which premiered at the Tribeca Film Festival. It was an official selection of the 2008 International Festival of Films on Art, London International LGFF, FRAMELINE, OUTFEST, REELING, and Seattle GLFF.

Career 
Taylor shot The Architecture of Rhythm (1989) on location in West Africa, the Caribbean, and Brazil. It was selected for the Distant Lives series co-produced by PBS and the Learning Channel, and broadcast nationally.

Taylor's 1982 film, Los Hijos de Sandino (The Children of Sandino) was shot in 16mm. In Show Us Life Chuck Kleinhans said: “The film presents the poetry of the revolution; that is the part of the total picture never captured in maps, charts and the official talking-head interviews with officials.” It was an award winner at the Global Village Documentary Festival, New York City, 1983 and was an invited participant at festivals in Havana, Edinburgh, Milan, and Mexico City.

Taylor was an annual Visiting Professor, Michigan State University from 1993-1999 where he created, designed and taught production courses in Great Britain and Mexico for the MSU Study Abroad program.{citation needed} He was a Senior Faculty Member at the School of Visual Arts in New York City from 1988-1999 where he was a senior production instructor and thesis advisor. He founded and taught at the New York International Media Group, an instructional workshop devoted to small format videography and filmmaking, 1982-1986. Currently, he is the Director of Maestro Media Productions in New York City.

Between 1999 and 2001, Taylor directed Great Writers/Great Cities for the Travel Channel. In four 60-minute films, the series showcased cities seen through the eyes of contemporary writers. Episodes included: Paco Taibo’s Mexico City, narrated by Edward James Olmos; Iain Sinclair’s London; Carl Hiaasen: From Miami to Key West with music and narration by Warren Zevon and New York Underground, with Lucy Sante, Samuel R. Delany, David Rieff, and Fran Lebowitz.

Taylor's film, Atlantis (2006), “a tantalizing treatment of the Brooklyn Bridge”[9] was shot in High-Definition for the HD Lab of Rainbow Media’s VOOM Channel VOOM Channel broadcast in December, 2006 and was the Official Selection of the New York Video Festival, 2007 and screened at Pacific Film Archives, 2008.

In 2007 he directed The Polymath or, The Life and Opinions of Samuel R. Delany, Gentleman. The film was received positive critical reception. The New Yorker said: "Taylor’s understated direction, featuring simple images that prod Delany’s recollections gently along, makes the film a lively and thoughtful look at a deeply lived-in life." Jump Cut said that “Taylor’s film illustrates Delany’s life through a series of what Roland Barthes called biographemes (preferences, inflections, details to which the author might be distilled).” It was voted Best Documentary Feature, 2008 at the Philadelphia International Gay and Lesbian Film Festival and was an official selection of the 2008 International Festival of Films on Art, Montreal, London International LGFF, FRAMELINE (San Francisco GLFF), OUTFEST (Los Angeles GLFF), REELING (Chicago International GLFF), Seattle GLFF.

Filmography 

 The Lethem Project, currently in post-production
 The Polymath or, The Life and Opinions of Samuel R. Delany, Gentleman (2007)
 Atlantis (2006)
 The Gates (2005)
 Vegas Around the World (2002-2003)
 Las Vegas Exposed (2002-2003)
 Great Writers/Great Cities (1999-2000): Paco Taibo’s Mexico City"; Iain Sinclair’s London"; Carl Hiaasen: From Miami to Key West"; New York Underground, with Luc Sante, Samuel R. Delany, David Rieff, and Fran Lebowitz"
 Conversations with Myself (1998)
 The NMAI Today (1997), Commissioned by the National Museum of the American Indian, for the Smithsonian Institution 
 Four Acts in Glass, Produced by the American Craft Museum, New York (1997)
 Mondo Miami (1995)
 The Way of the People (1992), Commissioned by the National Museum of the American Indian, for the Smithsonian Institution
 The Architecture of Rhythm (1989)
 Los Hijos de Sandino (The Children of Sandino) (1982)
 Lives of the Artists (1982)
 The Structuralist Films of David Rimmer (1973)

References

External links 
Fred Barney Taylor’s website

American documentary filmmakers
American experimental filmmakers
Film directors from New York City
Northwestern University alumni
University of Wisconsin–Madison alumni
Living people
1948 births